Jiangsu Shinco Technology Co., Ltd. is a Chinese manufacturer of consumer electronic appliances, which include air conditioner/heat pumps, TVs, DVD-Players, GPS  and washing machines. Established in 1980, the company has 8,000 employees at 12 manufacturing plants. In 2003 the company was producing five million DVD players a year.

References

External links
 

Companies based in Changzhou
Chinese companies established in 1980
Electronics companies of China
Home appliance manufacturers of China
Heating, ventilation, and air conditioning companies
Chinese brands